This is a list of symphonies in F major written by notable composers.

Notes

References

See also
For symphonies in other keys, see List of symphonies by key.

F major
Symphonies